Beatty Anchorage is a logging camp located on Louise Island, one of the Queen Charlotte Islands, now known as Haida Gwaii, in British Columbia, Canada.

Background
It is one of three large logging camps remaining on the islands since the heyday of Sitka spruce logging during World War II, the other two being Moresby Camp and Aero Camp.

References

Logging communities in Canada
Unincorporated settlements in British Columbia
Populated places in Haida Gwaii